

Events

Pre-1600
 681 – Pope Honorius I is posthumously excommunicated by the Sixth Ecumenical Council.
1400 – Owain Glyndŵr is declared Prince of Wales by his followers.

1601–1900
1620 – A determined band of 35 religious dissenters – Pilgrims set sail for Virginia from Plymouth, England in the Mayflower, jubilant at the prospect of practicing their unorthodox brand of worship in the New World. 
1701 – James Francis Edward Stuart, sometimes called the "Old Pretender", becomes the Jacobite claimant to the thrones of England and Scotland.
1732 – In Campo Maior, Portugal, a storm hits the Armory and a violent explosion ensues, killing two-thirds of its inhabitants.
1776 – American Revolutionary War: The Battle of Harlem Heights is fought.
1779 – American Revolutionary War: The Franco-American Siege of Savannah begins.
1810 – With the Grito de Dolores, Father Miguel Hidalgo begins Mexico's fight for independence from Spain.
1822 – French physicist Augustin-Jean Fresnel, in a "note" read to the Academy of Sciences, reports a direct refraction experiment verifying David Brewster's hypothesis that photoelasticity (as it is now known) is stress-induced birefringence.
1863 – Robert College, in Istanbul, the first American educational institution outside the United States, is founded by Christopher Robert, an American philanthropist.
1880 – The Cornell Daily Sun prints its first issue in Ithaca, New York. 
1893 – Settlers make a land run for prime land in the Cherokee Strip in Oklahoma.

1901–present
1908 – The General Motors Corporation is founded.
1914 – World War I: The Siege of Przemyśl (present-day Poland) begins.
1920 – The Wall Street bombing: A bomb in a horse wagon explodes in front of the J. P. Morgan building in New York City killing 38 and injuring 400.
1940 – World War II: Italian troops conquer Sidi Barrani.
1943 – World War II: The German Tenth Army reports that it can no longer contain the Allied bridgehead around Salerno.
1945 – World War II: The Japanese occupation of Hong Kong comes to an end.
1953 – American Airlines Flight 723 crashes in Colonie, New York, killing 28 people.
1955 – The military coup to unseat President Juan Perón of Argentina is launched at midnight.
  1955   – A Soviet Zulu-class submarine becomes the first to launch a ballistic missile. 
1956 – TCN-9 Sydney is the first Australian television station to commence regular broadcasts.
1959 – The first successful photocopier, the Xerox 914, is introduced in a demonstration on live television from New York City.
1961 – The United States National Hurricane Research Project drops eight cylinders of silver iodide into the eyewall of Hurricane Esther. Wind speed reduces by 10%, giving rise to Project Stormfury.
  1961   – Typhoon Nancy, with possibly the strongest winds ever measured in a tropical cyclone, makes landfall in Osaka, Japan, killing 173 people.
  1961   – Pakistan establishes its Space and Upper Atmosphere Research Commission with Abdus Salam as its head.
1963 – Malaysia is formed from the Federation of Malaya, Singapore, North Borneo (Sabah) and Sarawak. However, Singapore is soon expelled from this new country.
1966 – The Metropolitan Opera House opens at Lincoln Center in New York City with the world premiere of Samuel Barber's opera Antony and Cleopatra.
1970 – King Hussein of Jordan declares war against the Palestine Liberation Organization, the conflict came to be known as Black September.
1975 – Papua New Guinea gains independence from Australia.
  1975   – Cape Verde, Mozambique, and São Tomé and Príncipe join the United Nations.
  1975   – The first prototype of the Mikoyan MiG-31 interceptor makes its maiden flight.
1976 – Armenian champion swimmer Shavarsh Karapetyan saves 20 people from a trolleybus that had fallen into a Yerevan reservoir.
1978 – The 7.4  Tabas earthquake affects the city of Tabas, Iran with a maximum Mercalli intensity of IX (Violent). At least 15,000 people are killed.
1979 – Eight people escape from East Germany to the west in a homemade hot air balloon.
1982 – Lebanon War: The Sabra and Shatila massacre in Lebanon takes place.
1987 – The Montreal Protocol is signed to protect the ozone layer from depletion.
1990 – The railroad between the People's Republic of China and Kazakhstan is completed at Dostyk, adding a sizable link to the concept of the Eurasian Land Bridge.
1992 – The trial of the deposed Panamanian dictator Manuel Noriega ends in the United States with a 40-year sentence for drug trafficking and money laundering.
  1992   – Black Wednesday: The British pound is forced out of the European Exchange Rate Mechanism by currency speculators and is forced to devalue against the German mark.
1994 – The British government lifts the broadcasting ban imposed against members of Sinn Féin and Irish paramilitary groups in 1988.
2004 – Hurricane Ivan makes landfall in Gulf Shores, Alabama as a Category 3 hurricane.
2005 – The Camorra organized crime boss Paolo Di Lauro is arrested in Naples, Italy.
2007 – One-Two-GO Airlines Flight 269 carrying 130 crew and passengers crashes in Thailand, killing 90 people.
  2007   – Security guards working for Blackwater Worldwide shoot and kill 17 Iraqis in Nisour Square, Baghdad.
2013 – A gunman kills twelve people at the Washington Navy Yard.
2014 – The Islamic State of Iraq and the Levant launches its Kobani offensive against Syrian–Kurdish forces.
2015 – A 8.3  earthquake strikes the Chilean city of Illapel, killing 15 people, injuring at least 34, leaving at least six missing, and causing extensive damage. One person also dies in Argentina.
2019 – Five months before the COVID-19 stock market crash, an overnight spike in lending rates in the United States prompts the Federal Reserve to conduct operations in the repo market.
2021 – A 6.0  earthquake strikes Lu County, Sichuan, China, killing three and injuring more than 88.
2022 – During the Let Yet Kone massacre, the Burmese military kills 13 villagers, including 8 children, after attacking a school in Sagaing Region, Myanmar.

Births

Pre-1600
AD 16 – Julia Drusilla, Roman daughter of Germanicus (d. 38)
 508 – Yuan Di, emperor of the Liang dynasty (d. 555)
1295 – Elizabeth de Clare, English noblewoman (d. 1360)
1386 – Henry V of England (d. 1422)
1462 – Pietro Pomponazzi, Italian philosopher (d. 1525)
1507 – Jiajing Emperor of China (d. 1567)
1541 – Walter Devereux, 1st Earl of Essex, English nobleman (d. 1576)
1557 – Jacques Mauduit, French composer (d. 1627)

1601–1900
1615 – Heinrich Bach, German organist and composer (d. 1692)
1625 – Gregorio Barbarigo, Roman Catholic saint (d. 1697)
1651 – Engelbert Kaempfer, German physician and botanist (d. 1716)
1666 – Antoine Parent, French mathematician and theorist (d. 1716)
1678 – Henry St John, 1st Viscount Bolingbroke, English philosopher and politician, Secretary of State for the Southern Department (d. 1751)
1716 – Angelo Maria Amorevoli, Italian tenor and actor (d. 1798)
1722 – Gabriel Christie, Scottish-Canadian general (d. 1799)
1725 – Nicolas Desmarest, French geologist, zoologist, and author (d. 1815)
1745 – Mikhail Kutuzov, Russian field marshal (d. 1813)
1777 – Nathan Mayer Rothschild, German-English banker and financier (d. 1836)
1782 – Daoguang Emperor of China (d. 1850)
1812 – Anna Louisa Geertruida Bosboom-Toussaint, Dutch novelist (d. 1886)
1823 – Francis Parkman, American historian and author (d. 1893)
  1823   – Ludwik Teichmann, Polish anatomist (d. 1895)
1827 – Jean Albert Gaudry, French geologist and paleontologist (d. 1908)
1828 – Per Pålsson, Swedish murderer (d. 1914)
1830 – Patrick Francis Moran, Irish-Australian cardinal (d. 1911)
1837 – Pedro V of Portugal (d. 1861)
1838 – James J. Hill, Canadian-American railroad executive (d. 1916)
1844 – Paul Taffanel, French flute player and conductor (d. 1908)
1846 – Anna Kingsford, English author, poet, and activist (d. 1888)
1853 – Albrecht Kossel, German physician and biochemist, Nobel Prize laureate (d. 1927)
1858 – Edward Marshall Hall, English lawyer and politician (d. 1927)
  1858   – Bonar Law, Canadian-Scottish banker and politician, Prime Minister of the United Kingdom (d. 1923)
1859 – Yuan Shikai, Chinese general and politician, President of the Republic of China (d. 1916)
1861 – Miriam Benjamin, African-American educator and inventor (d. 1947)
1866 – Georg Voigt, German lawyer and politician, Mayor of Marburg (d. 1927)
1870 – John Pius Boland, Irish tennis player and politician (d. 1958)
1875 – James Cash Penney, American businessman and philanthropist, founded J. C. Penney (d. 1971)
1876 – Marvin Hart, American boxer (d. 1931)
1877 – Jacob Schick, American-Canadian inventor and businessman, founded Schick Razors (d. 1937)
1878 – Karl Albiker, German sculptor, lithographer, and educator (d. 1961)
1880 – Clara Ayres, American nurse (d. 1917)
  1880   – Alfred Noyes, English author, poet, and playwright (d. 1958)
1881 – Clive Bell, English philosopher and critic (d. 1964)
1883 – T. E. Hulme, English poet and critic (d. 1917)
1886 – Jean Arp, Alsatian sculptor and painter (d. 1966)
1887 – Nadia Boulanger, French composer and educator (d. 1979)
1888 – W. O. Bentley, English race car driver and engineer, founded Bentley Motors Limited (d. 1971)
  1888   – Frans Eemil Sillanpää, Finnish author, Nobel Prize laureate (d. 1964)
1890 – Avigdor Hameiri, Israeli author (d. 1970)
1891 – Karl Dönitz, German admiral and politician, President of Germany (d. 1980)
  1891   – Stephanie von Hohenlohe, Austrian-German spy (d. 1972)
1893 – Alexander Korda, Hungarian-English director, producer, and screenwriter (d. 1956)
  1893   – Albert Szent-Györgyi, Hungarian-American physiologist and biochemist, Nobel Prize laureate (d. 1986)
1895 – Zainal Abidin Ahmad, Malaysian author and scholar (d. 1973)
1897 – Milt Franklyn, American composer (d. 1962)
1898 – H. A. Rey, American author and illustrator, co-created Curious George (d. 1977)
1899 – Hans Swarowsky, Hungarian-Austrian conductor and educator (d. 1975)

1901–present
1901 – Josef Schächter, Austrian rabbi and philosopher from the Vienna Circle (d. 1994)
1905 – Vladimír Holan, Czech poet and author (d. 1980)
1906 – Jack Churchill, Sri Lankan-British colonel (d. 1996)
1910 – Erich Kempka, German colonel and chauffeur (d. 1975)
  1910   – Karl Kling, German race car driver and manager (d. 2003)
1911 – Wilfred Burchett, Australian journalist and author (d. 1983)
  1911   – Paul Henning, American screenwriter and producer (d. 2005)
1914 – Allen Funt, American director, producer, and screenwriter (d. 1999)
1915 – Cy Walter, American pianist (d. 1968)
1916 – Robert Llewellyn Bradshaw, Caribbean politician, 1st Prime Minister of Saint Kitts and Nevis (d. 1978)
  1916   – Frank Farrell, Australian rugby league player and policeman (d. 1985)  
  1916   – M. S. Subbulakshmi, Indian Carnatic vocalist (d. 2004) 
  1916   – Frank Leslie Walcott, Barbadian cricketer, umpire, and politician (d. 1999)
  1916   – Marie Vieux-Chauvet, Haitian writer (d. 1973)
  1916   – Raosaheb Gogte, Indian industrialist (d. 2000)
1918 – Władysław Kędra, Polish pianist (d. 1968)
1919 – Bill Daley, American football player and sportscaster (d. 2015)
  1919   – Laurence J. Peter, Canadian-American hierarchiologist and educator (d. 1990)
  1919   – Andy Russell, American singer and actor (d. 1992) 
1920 – Staryl C. Austin, American air force general (d. 2015)
  1920   – Sheila Quinn, English nurse and educator (d. 2016)
  1920   – Art Sansom, American cartoonist (d. 1991)
1921 – Ursula Franklin, German-Canadian metallurgist (d. 2016)
  1921   – Jon Hendricks, American singer-songwriter (d. 2017)
  1921   – Korla Pandit, American pianist and composer (d. 1998)
1922 – Guy Hamilton, French-English director and screenwriter (d. 2016)
  1922   – Janis Paige, American actress and singer
1923 – Lee Kuan Yew, Singaporean lawyer and politician, 1st Prime Minister of Singapore (d. 2015)
1924 – Lauren Bacall, American actress (d. 2014)
1925 – Charlie Byrd, American singer and guitarist (d. 1999)
  1925   – Charles Haughey, Irish accountant, lawyer, and politician, 7th Taoiseach of Ireland (d. 2006)
  1925   – B.B. King, American singer-songwriter, guitarist, and producer (d. 2015)
1926 – Eric Gross, Austrian-Australian pianist and composer (d. 2011)
  1926   – John Knowles, American novelist (d. 2001)
  1926   – Roger McKee, American baseball player (d. 2014)
  1926   – Robert H. Schuller, American pastor and author (d. 2015)
1927 – Peter Falk, American actor (d. 2011)
  1927   – Jack Kelly, American actor and politician (d. 1992)
  1927   – Sadako Ogata, Japanese academic and diplomat, United Nations High Commissioner for Refugees (d. 2019)
1928 – Rex Trailer, American television host, actor, and singer (d. 2013)
  1928   – Lady Gwen Thompson, English author and educator (d. 1986)
  1928   – Patricia Wald, American judge (d. 2019)
1929 – Jamshid bin Abdullah of Zanzibar, last sultan of Zanzibar
  1929   – Stan Stephens, Canadian-American politician, 20th Governor of Montana (d. 2021)
1930 – Anne Francis, American actress (d. 2011)
1931 – K. D. Arulpragasam, Sri Lankan zoologist and academic (d. 2003)
  1931   – Little Willie Littlefield, American-Dutch singer-songwriter and pianist (d. 2013)
1932 – Micky Stewart, English cricketer and coach
1933 – Steve Shirley, German-English businesswoman and philanthropist, founded Xansa
1934 – Elgin Baylor, American basketball player and coach (d. 2021)
  1934   – George Chakiris, American actor, singer, and dancer
  1934   – Ronnie Drew, Irish singer-songwriter and guitarist  (d. 2008)
1935 – Carl Andre, American sculptor 
  1935   – Billy Boy Arnold, American singer-songwriter and guitarist
  1935   – Jules Bass, American director, producer, composer, and author (d. 2022)
  1935   – Lilia Cuntapay, Filipino actress (d. 2016)
  1935   – Bob Kiley, American-English businessman (d. 2016)
  1935   – Esther Vilar, Argentinian-German author and playwright
1937 – Aleksandr Medved, Russian wrestler
  1937   – Vince Naimoli, American businessman and philanthropist (d. 2019)
1939 – Breyten Breytenbach, South African-French poet and painter
  1939   – Bill McGill, American basketball player (d. 2014)
1940 – Hamiet Bluiett, American jazz saxophonist and composer (d. 2018)
  1940   – Butch Buchholz, American tennis player
1941 – Joe Butler, American singer, autoharp player, and drummer
  1941   – Richard Perle, American political scientist and politician
1942 – Bernie Calvert, English bass player and keyboard player 
  1942   – Susan L. Graham, American computer scientist and academic
1943 – Wang Houjun, Chinese footballer and manager (d. 2012)
  1943   – James Alan McPherson,  American short story writer and essayist (d. 2016)
1944 – Linda Kaye Henning, American actress
  1944   – Betty Kelly, American soul/R&B singer
1946 – Sonny LeMaire, American country music singer-songwriter and bass player
  1946   – Mike Reynolds, Australian lawyer and politician
  1946   – Camilo Sesto, Spanish singer-songwriter and producer (d. 2019)
1947 – Dusty Hughes, English director and playwright
1948 – Ron Blair, American bass player 
  1948   – Rosemary Casals, American tennis player and sportscaster
  1948   – Julia Donaldson, English author and playwright
  1948   – Kenney Jones, English drummer
  1948   – Susan Ruttan, American actress
1949 – Ed Begley Jr., American actor and environmental activist   
1950 – David Bellamy, American singer-songwriter and guitarist
  1950   – Henry Louis Gates Jr., American historian, scholar, and journalist
  1950   – Loyd Grossman, American-English singer, guitarist, and television host
1951 – Vince Bell, American singer-songwriter and guitarist 
  1951   – Andy Irvine, Scottish rugby player and coach
1952 – Tony Cunningham, English educator and politician
  1952   – Česlovas Laurinavičius, Lithuanian historian
  1952   – Karen Muir, South African swimmer and physician (d. 2013)
  1952   – Mickey Rourke, American boxer and actor 
  1953   – Kurt Fuller, American character actor
1953 – Alan Barton, English singer and guitarist (d. 1995)
  1953   – Nancy Huston, Canadian-American author and translator
  1953   – Mark Malloch Brown, Baron Malloch-Brown, English journalist and politician, 2nd Deputy Secretary-General of the United Nations
  1953   – Jerry Pate, American golfer and sportscaster
  1953   – Manuel Pellegrini, Chilean footballer and manager
  1953   – Eric Vail, Canadian ice hockey player and sportscaster
1954 – Sanjoy Bandopadhyay, Indian sitar player and composer
  1954   – Earl Klugh, American guitarist and composer
  1954   – William McKeen, American author and academic
  1954   – Colin Newman, English singer-songwriter, guitarist and producer 
  1954   – Frank Reed, American singer-songwriter (d. 2014)
  1954   – Roger Woolley, Australian cricketer
1955 – Ron Brewer, American basketball player
  1955   – Robin Yount, American baseball player and coach
1956 – Maggie Atkinson, English educator and civil servant
  1956   – David Copperfield, American magician and actor
  1956   – Ross Greenberg, American journalist and antivirus pioneer (d. 2017)
  1956   – Dave Schulthise, American bass player (d. 2004)
  1956   – Kazuharu Sonoda, Japanese wrestler (d. 1987)
1957 – D. C. Drake, American wrestler
  1957   – Clara Furse, English businesswoman
  1957   – Norman Lamb, English lawyer and politician
  1957   – David McCreery, Northern Irish footballer and manager
  1957   – Anca Parghel, Romanian singer and pianist (d. 2008)
1958 – Orel Hershiser, American baseball player and coach
  1958   – Neville Southall, Welsh footballer and manager
  1958   – Jennifer Tilly, American actress and poker player
1959 – Peter Keleghan, Canadian actor and screenwriter
  1959   – Tim Raines, American baseball player, coach, and manager
  1959   – Dave Richardson, South African cricketer, manager, and lawyer
  1959   – Victory Tischler-Blue, American bass player, director, and producer 
1960 – Graham Haynes, American trumpet player and composer
  1960   – Mike Mignola, American author and illustrator
1961 – Bilinda Butcher, English singer-songwriter and guitarist
  1961   – Philip Lafon, Canadian wrestler
  1961   – Annamária Szalai, Hungarian journalist, economist, and politician (d. 2013)
1962 – Seth, Canadian author and illustrator
1963 – Richard Marx, American singer-songwriter and producer
1964 – Mary Coustas, Australian actress and screenwriter
  1964   – Rossy de Palma, Spanish-French model and actress
  1964   – Dave Sabo, American guitarist and songwriter 
  1964   – Molly Shannon, American actress, comedian and producer
1965 – Katy Kurtzman, American actress and producer
  1965   – Karl-Heinz Riedle, German footballer and manager
  1965   – Stephen Shareaux, American singer-songwriter 
1966 – John Bel Edwards, American attorney and politician 
  1966   – Wil McCarthy, American author and playwright
  1966   – Kevin Young, American hurdler
1967 – Hiroya Oku, Japanese author and illustrator
1967 – Damon Thayer, Kentucky State Senate Majority Leader
1968 – Marc Anthony, American singer-songwriter, actor, and producer
  1968   – Walt Becker, American director, producer, and screenwriter
  1968   – Tommy Keane, Irish footballer (d. 2012)
1969 – Justine Frischmann, English singer-songwriter and guitarist 
  1969   – Janno Gibbs, Filipino singer-songwriter and actor
1970 – Mark Schultz, American singer-songwriter
1971 – Joel Heyman, American actor, producer, and screenwriter
  1971   – Charlie Jacobs, American businessman
  1971   – Amy Poehler, American actress, comedian, and producer
  1971   – Richard Slinger, American wrestler
  1971   – Shawntel Smith, American beauty pageant contestant
1972 – Mark Bruener, American football player
  1972   – Mike Doyle, American actor and producer
  1972   – Alessandro Nunziati, Italian singer-songwriter and producer 
1973 – George Corrie, English footballer
  1973   – Camiel Eurlings, Dutch businessman and member of the International Olympic Committee
  1973   – Justin Haythe, American author and screenwriter
  1973   – Alexander Vinokourov, Kazakh cyclist and manager
1974 – Loona, Dutch singer-songwriter and dancer
  1974   – Monique Brumby, Australian singer-songwriter, guitarist, and producer
  1974   – Joaquin Castro, American lawyer and politician 
  1974   – Julian Castro, American lawyer and politician, 16th United States Secretary of Housing and Urban Development
1975 – Jason Leffler, American race car driver (d. 2013)
  1975   – Shannon Noll, Australian singer-songwriter
1976 – Elīna Garanča, Latvian soprano
  1976   – Tina Barrett, English singer-songwriter, dancer, and actress 
  1976   – Greg Buckner, American basketball player and coach
1977 – Gregory Ball, American captain and politician
  1977   – Musiq Soulchild, American singer-songwriter
1978 – Dan Dickau, American basketball player and coach
  1978   – Claudia Marx, German runner
  1978   – Sensei, Mexican wrestler
  1978   – Brian Sims, American lawyer, politician, and LGBT activist
1979 – Fanny, French singer
  1979   – Bobby Korecky, American baseball player
1980 – Patrik Štefan, Czech ice hockey player
  1980   – Kenny van Weeghel, Dutch wheelchair racer
1981 – Fan Bingbing, Chinese actress, singer, and producer
  1981   – Alexis Bledel, American actress
  1981   – LaVerne Jones-Ferrette, Virgin Islander sprinter
1982 – Leon Knight, English footballer
  1982   – Michele Rizzo, Italian rugby player
  1982   – Fiete Sykora, German footballer
  1982   – Ryan Thomson, Scottish footballer
1983 – John Afoa, New Zealand rugby player
  1983   – Katerine Avgoustakis, Belgian singer and pianist
  1983   – Jennifer Blake, Canadian wrestler
  1983   – Kirsty Coventry, Zimbabwean swimmer
  1983   – Brandon Moss, American baseball player
  1983   – Legedu Naanee, American football player
1984 – Sabrina Bryan, American singer-songwriter, dancer, and actress 
  1984   – Serginho Catarinense, Brazilian footballer
  1984   – Katie Melua, Georgian-English singer-songwriter and guitarist 
1985 – Max Minghella, English actor
1986 – Gordon Beckham, American baseball player
  1986   – Kyla Pratt, American actress and singer
1987 – Merve Boluğur, Turkish actress
  1987   – Kyle Lafferty, Irish footballer
  1987   – Louis Ngwat-Mahop, Cameroonian footballer
  1987   – Burry Stander, South African cyclist (d. 2013)
  1987   – Travis Wall, American dancer and choreographer
1988 – Teddy Geiger, American singer-songwriter, guitarist, and actress
1989 – Lancelot Bravado, American wrestler
  1989   – Braden Holtby, Canadian ice hockey player
  1989   – José Salomón Rondón, Venezuelan footballer
  1989   – Dustin Tokarski, Canadian ice hockey player
1991 – Diāna Bukājeva, Latvian tennis player
  1991   – Alexandra Paul, Canadian figure skater
  1991   – Kyle Smith, English motorcycle racer
1992 – Vytenis Čižauskas, Lithuanian basketball player
  1992   – Nick Jonas, American singer-songwriter and guitarist
  1992   – Jake Roche, English singer-songwriter and actor 
1993 – Sam Byram, English footballer
1994 – Mitchell Moses, Australian rugby league player

Deaths

Pre-1600
 307 – Flavius Valerius Severus, Roman emperor
 655 – Pope Martin I 
1087 – Pope Victor III (b. 1026)
1100 – Bernold of Constance, German priest and historian (b. 1054)
1122 – Vitalis of Savigny, Catholic French saint and itinerant preacher (b. 1060)
1226 – Pandulf Verraccio, Roman ecclesiastical politician
1343 – Philip III of Navarre (b. 1306)
1345 – John IV, Duke of Brittany (b. 1295)
1360 – William de Bohun, 1st Earl of Northampton (b. 1319)
1380 – Charles V of France (b. 1338)
1394 – Antipope Clement VII (b. 1342)
1406 – Cyprian, Metropolitan of Moscow (b. 1336)
1498 – Tomás de Torquemada, Spanish friar (b. 1420)
1581 – Peter Niers, notorious German bandit (date of birth unknown)
1583 – Catherine Jagiellon, queen of John II of Sweden (b. 1526)
1589 – Michael Baius, Belgian theologian and academic (b. 1513)

1601–1900
1607 – Mary Stuart, English-Scottish princess (b. 1605)
1672 – Anne Bradstreet, English poet (b. 1612)
1701 – James II of England (b. 1633)
1736 – Daniel Gabriel Fahrenheit, Polish-Dutch physicist and engineer, invented the thermometer (b. 1686)
1792 – Nguyễn Huệ, Vietnamese emperor (b. 1753)
1803 – Nicolas Baudin, French explorer, hydrographer, and cartographer (b. 1754)
1819 – John Jeffries, American physician and surgeon (b. 1744)
1824 – Louis XVIII of France (b. 1755)
1843 – Ezekiel Hart, Canadian businessman and politician (b. 1770)
1845 – Thomas Davis, Irish poet and publisher (b. 1814)
1865 – Christian de Meza, Danish general (b. 1792)
1887 – Sakaigawa Namiemon, Japanese sumo wrestler, the 14th Yokozuna (b. 1841)
1896 – Antônio Carlos Gomes, Brazilian composer (b. 1836)
  1896   – Pavlos Kalligas, Greek jurist and politician, Foreign Minister of Greece (b. 1814)
1898 – Ramón Emeterio Betances, Puerto Rican surgeon and politician (b. 1827)

1901–present
1911 – Edward Whymper, English-French mountaineer, explorer, and author (b. 1840)
1914 – C. X. Larrabee, American businessman (b. 1843)
1919 – Maria Nikiforova, Ukrainian anarchist partisan leader (b. 1885)
1925 – Leo Fall, Czech-Austrian composer (b. 1873)
  1925   – Alexander Friedmann, Russian physicist and mathematician (b. 1888)
1931 – Omar Mukhtar, Libyan theorist and educator (b. 1862)
1932 – Millicent Lilian "Peg" Entwistle, British stage and screen actress (b. 1908)
  1932   – Ronald Ross, Indian-English physician and mathematician, Nobel Prize laureate (b. 1857)
1933 – George Gore, American baseball player and manager (b. 1857)
1936 – Jean-Baptiste Charcot, French physician and explorer (b. 1867)
1940 – Charles Cochrane-Baillie, 2nd Baron Lamington, English-Scottish politician, 8th Governor of Queensland (b. 1860)
1944 – Gustav Bauer, German journalist and politician, 11th Chancellor of Germany (b. 1870)
1945 – John McCormack, Irish tenor and actor (b. 1884)
1946 – James Hopwood Jeans, English physicist, astronomer, and mathematician (b. 1877)
1950 – Pedro de Cordoba, American actor (b. 1881)
1955 – Leo Amery, Indian-English journalist and politician, Secretary of State for the Colonies (b. 1873)
1961 – Hasan Polatkan, Turkish politician, 15th Turkish Minister of Finance (b. 1915)
  1961   – Fatin Rüştü Zorlu, Turkish diplomat and politician, 21st Deputy Prime Minister of Turkey (b. 1910)
1965 – Ahn Eak-tai, North Korean composer and conductor (b. 1906)
  1965   – Fred Quimby, American animator and producer (b. 1886)
1973 – Víctor Jara, Chilean singer-songwriter, teacher and theatre director (b. 1932)
1976 – Bertha Lutz, Brazilian feminist and scientist (b. 1894)
1977 – Marc Bolan, English singer-songwriter and guitarist  (b. 1947)
  1977   – Maria Callas, Greek operatic soprano (b. 1923)
1980 – Jean Piaget, Swiss psychologist and philosopher (b. 1896)
1984 – Louis Réard, French engineer and fashion designer, created the bikini (b. 1897)
  1984   – Richard Brautigan, American novelist, poet, and short story writer (b. 1935)
  1987   – Christopher Soames, English soldier and politician, Governor of Southern Rhodesia (b. 1920)
1991 – Olga Spessivtseva, Russian-American ballerina (b. 1895)
1992 – Millicent Fenwick, American journalist and politician (b. 1910)
1993 – František Jílek, Czech conductor (b. 1913)
  1993   – Oodgeroo Noonuccal, Australian poet and activist (b. 1920)
1996 – McGeorge Bundy, American intelligence officer and diplomat, 6th United States National Security Advisor (b. 1919)
  1996   – Gene Nelson, American actor, dancer, and director (b. 1920)
2001 – Samuel Z. Arkoff, American producer (b. 1918)
2002 – James Gregory, American actor (b. 1911)
2003 – Sheb Wooley, American singer-songwriter (b. 1921)
2004 – Michael Donaghy, American-English poet and author (b. 1954)
2005 – Harry Freedman, Canadian horn player, composer, and educator (b. 1922)
  2005   – Gordon Gould, American physicist and academic, invented the laser (b. 1920)
2006 – Floyd Curry, Canadian ice hockey player and coach (b. 1925)
  2006   – Zsuzsa Körmöczy, Hungarian tennis player and coach (b. 1924)
2007 – Robert Jordan, American engineer and author (b. 1948)
2008 – Norman Whitfield, American songwriter and producer (b. 1940)
2009 – Myles Brand, American philosopher and academic (b. 1942)
  2009   – Ernst Märzendorfer, Austrian conductor (b. 1921)
  2009   – Mary Travers, American singer-songwriter (b. 1936)
2010 – George N. Parks, American educator and bandleader (b. 1953)
  2010   – Jim Towers, English footballer (b. 1933)
2011 – Willie "Big Eyes" Smith, American singer-songwriter, harmonica player, and drummer (b. 1936)
2011 – Enamul Haque Chowdhury, Bangladeshi politician (b. 1948)
2012 – Roman Kroitor, Canadian director and producer, co-founded IMAX (b. 1926)
  2012   – Julien J. LeBourgeois, American admiral (b. 1923)
  2012   – Friedrich Zimmermann, German lawyer and politician, German Federal Minister of the Interior (b. 1925)
2013 – Scott Adams, American football player (b. 1966)
  2013   – Ratiba El-Hefny, Egyptian soprano and director (b. 1931)
  2013   – Patsy Swayze, American dancer and choreographer (b. 1927)
2015 – Guy Béart, Egyptian-French singer-songwriter (b. 1930)
  2015   – Julio Brady, Virgin Islander lawyer, judge, and politician, 5th Lieutenant Governor of the United States Virgin Islands (b. 1942)
  2015   – Kurt Oppelt, Austrian figure skater and coach (b. 1932)
  2015   – Allan Wright, English captain and pilot (b. 1920)
2016 – Edward Albee, American director and playwright (b. 1928)
  2016   – Gabriele Amorth, Italian priest and exorcist (b. 1925)
  2016   – Carlo Azeglio Ciampi, Italian economist and politician, 10th President of Italy and 49th Prime Minister of Italy (b. 1920)
  2016   – W. P. Kinsella, American novelist (b. 1935)
  2016   – António Mascarenhas Monteiro, Cabo Verdean politician, 2nd President of Cape Verde (b. 1944) 
  2016   – Gérard Louis-Dreyfus, French-born American businessman (b. 1932)
2017 – Marcelo Rezende, Brazilian journalist (b. 1951)
  2017   – Arjan Singh, Marshal of the Indian Air Force (b. 1919)
2018 – James Burdette Thayer, American brigadier general (b. 1920)
2019 – H. S. Dillon, Indonesian politician and human rights defender (b. 1945)
2020 – Maxim Martsinkevich, Russian social activist and media personality (b. 1984) 
2021 – Jane Powell, American actress (b. 1929)
  2021   – Clive Sinclair, English entrepreneur and inventor (b. 1940)

Holidays and observances
 Christian feast day:
 Andrew Kim Taegon (one of The Korean Martyrs)
 Curcodomus
 Cyprian (Catholic Church)
 Edith of Wilton
 Euphemia
 Ludmila
 Ninian
 Pope Cornelius
 Vitalis of Savigny
 September 16 (Eastern Orthodox liturgics).
Cry of Dolores, celebrates the declaration of independence of Mexico from Spain in 1810. See Fiestas Patrias
 Independence Day (Papua New Guinea), celebrates the independence of Papua New Guinea from Australia in 1975.
 International Day for the Preservation of the Ozone Layer
Malaysian Armed Forces Day (Malaysia)
 Malaysia Day (Malaysia, Singapore)
 Martyrs' Day (Libya)
 National Heroes Day (Saint Kitts and Nevis)

References

External links

 
 
 

Days of the year
September